Moirainpa is a genus of ground beetles in the family Carabidae. This genus has a single species, Moirainpa amazona. It is found in Brazil.

References

Trechinae
Monotypic Carabidae genera